Bencomo (1438 – 1495) was the penultimate mencey or king of Taoro, a Guanche menceyato on the island of Tenerife. He fought in the First Battle of Acentejo, a victory for the Guanches against the invading Castilians, after having refused the terms of Alonso Fernández de Lugo. He may have perished on the heights of San Roque during the Battle of Aguere alongside his brother Tinguaro.

He had several children, including Adjona, Dácil, Bentor, Ruiman, Rosalva, Chachiñama, and Tiñate. Bentor succeeded him as mencey until his suicide in February 1495.

References 

1495 deaths
15th-century Berber people
People from Tenerife
Military personnel killed in action
Guanche people
Year of birth uncertain
1438 births